The Florida Association of Christian Colleges and Schools (FACCS) is an organization that accredits Florida's Christian schools. It holds teachers conventions and annual competitions for its member schools. It is a member of the National Council for Private School Accreditation and is recognized by the Florida Association of Academic Nonpublic Schools.

See also
Dade Christian School
King's Academy, The
North Florida Christian High School
Pensacola Christian Academy
Winter Haven Christian School

References

External links
Official Site

United States schools associations
Christian schools in Florida